Génération Nation, formerly the Front National de la Jeunesse (FNJ) until June 2018, is the youth organization of the French National Rally, founded in 1973.
Anyone between 16 and 30 can become a member since 2011. The FNJ had 25,000 members in December 2013.

Internal organization

Presidents 
 1973–1983: Christian Baeckeroot
 1983–1986: Carl Lang
 1986–1992: Martial Bild
 1992–1999: Samuel Maréchal
 1999–2000: Guillaume Luyt
 2000–2001: Erwan Le Gouëllec
 2001–2004: Louis-Armand de Béjarry
 2005: Arnaud Frery
 2005–2008: Alexandre Ayroulet
 2008–2009: Loïc Lemarinier
 2009–2011: David Rachline
 2011–2012: Nathalie Pigeot
 2012–2014: Julien Rochedy
 2014–2018: Gaëtan Dussausaye
 March 2018–present: Jordan Bardella

Notes and references 

National Rally (France)
Youth wings of political parties
Youth organizations established in 1973
Youth wings of conservative parties